Lestock is a special service area within the Rural Municipality of Kellross No. 247, Saskatchewan, Canada that held village status prior to September 2017. Lestock had a population of 95 in the 2016 Canada Census, a -24.0% decline from 125 in the 2011 Canada Census.

The community was named after John Lestock Reid, a surveyor for the railway.

History 
Lestock was incorporated as a village on April 17, 1912. It restructured on September 1, 2017, relinquishing its village status in favour of becoming a special service area under the jurisdiction of the Rural Municipality of Kellross No. 247.

Demographics

See also 
List of communities in Saskatchewan
List of special service areas in Saskatchewan

References 

Rural Municipality of Kellross No. 247
Special service areas in Saskatchewan
Former villages in Saskatchewan
Populated places disestablished in 2017
Division No. 10, Saskatchewan